Robert Cochran or Cochrane may refer to:

Robert Leroy Cochran (1886–1963), former governor of Nebraska
Robert E. Cochran, defender at the Battle of the Alamo
Bobby Cochran (born 1950), American singer-songwriter
Bob Cochran (skier) (born 1951), former U.S. alpine ski racer; member of Skiing Cochrans family of Vermont
Robert Cochran (TV producer),  co-creator of the television series 24 
Robert Cochran (actor), British actor
Robert Cochrane (favourite) (died 1482), associate of James III of Scotland
Robert Cochrane (witch) (1931–1966), English witch
Robert Alexander Cochran (1917–1965), American film actor better known as Steve Cochran
Robert H. Cochrane (1924–2010), bishop of the Episcopal Diocese of Olympia